Sugarloaf Hill lies between the Worcestershire Beacon and North Hill in the range of Malvern Hills that runs about  north-south along the Herefordshire-Worcestershire border.

References

Marilyns of England
Hills of Worcestershire
Malvern Hills
Malvern, Worcestershire